The 2013–14 Albany Great Danes women's basketball team represents the University at Albany, SUNY during the 2013–14 NCAA Division I women's basketball season. The Great Danes, led by 4th year head coach Katie Abrahamson-Henderson, play their home games at SEFCU Arena and are members of the America East Conference. The Great Danes entered the season as back-to-back defending champs in the America East. The Danes continued their success of the previous season by winning the 2014 America East tournament for their third consecutive championship.

Roster

Schedule

|-
!colspan=12 style=| Regular season

|-
!colspan=12 style=| 2014 America East tournament

|-
!colspan=12 style=| 2014 NCAA Tournament

References

Albany
Albany Great Danes women's basketball seasons
Albany
Albany Great Danes
Albany Great Danes